Maurice Baudechon (9 July 1890 – 25 April 1963) was a French rower. He competed in the men's eight event at the 1924 Summer Olympics.

References

External links
 

1890 births
1963 deaths
French male rowers
Olympic rowers of France
Rowers at the 1924 Summer Olympics
Place of birth missing